Discotheque CVB: Live in Chicago is a 2004 live album by Camper Van Beethoven recorded at Metro Chicago on October 29, 2004. A selection of other tracks from this concert was released as an Internet-only download titled Seven Hillbilly Punk Ska Classics.

Track listing
"Eye of Fatima (part 1)"
"Eye of Fatima (part 2)"
"Sad Lover's Waltz"
"Might Makes Right"
"The Long Plastic Hallway"
"Hippy Chix"
"That Gum You Like Is Back in Style"

Camper Van Beethoven albums
2004 live albums